Ford Beebe (November 26, 1888 – November 26, 1978) was a screenwriter and director. He entered the film business as a writer around 1916 and over the next 60 years wrote and/or directed almost 200 films.

He specialized in B-movies – mostly Westerns – and action serials, working on the "Buck Rogers" and "Flash Gordon" serials for Universal Pictures.

Life
Ford Beebe was born on November 26, 1888, in Grand Rapids, Michigan. Before moving to Hollywood he was a freelance writer who was also experienced in advertising. He arrived in Hollywood in 1916 and began working as a writer for Western films. His first credit was as scenario writer for the 1916 film A Youth of Fortune. Beebe directed for the first time when Leo D. Maloney, who had been directing a film called The Test, fell ill. Beebe became known as a director of low-budget films and serials. He was once described as being "an expert at making something out of nothing." The first serial directed by Beebe was 1932's The Shadow of the Eagle. He went on to direct several other serials, notably Flash Gordon's Trip to Mars, Buck Rogers, The Green Hornet, and Don Winslow of the Navy; these were noted by film historian Hal Erickson to be the best of Beebe's works.

Beebe preferred to direct westerns; speaking to the Evening Independent, he said that westerns were the "bread and butter" of film studios. He was listed as a director on over 100 films. Alfred Hitchcock commended Beebe for his 1942 film Night Monster, impressed with the speed and economy of the production.

Beebe was married to writer Frances Wiley. The couple had eight children.  Their only son, Ford Beebe, Jr., became a director like his father.  They lost twin daughters in infancy and had five daughters who survived it: Frances, Mary, Ruthann, Maxine, and Martha. In Beebe's later life he was married to Kitty Delevanti, with whom he had one son, Mike.

Selected filmography

References
 Notes

 Bibliography

External links
 

1888 births
1978 deaths
American male screenwriters
Film directors from Michigan
Film serial crew
Western (genre) film directors
Science fiction film directors
20th-century American male writers
20th-century American screenwriters